Edmund Ian Marshall (born 31 May 1940) is a British politician and churchman.

Early life
Marshall was born in Manchester. He was educated at Humberstone Foundation School (also known as Clee Grammar School for Boys for Boys, which became the comprehensive Matthew Humberstone School in September 1973) on Clee Road in Old Clee, Cleethorpes, and Magdalen College, Oxford, where he took double first class honours in mathematics and was awarded a University Junior Mathematical Prize in 1961. Marshall gained a PhD from the University of Liverpool in 1965. He became a mathematics university lecturer and a Methodist local preacher, also serving as Vice-president of the Methodist Conference in 1992.

Parliamentary career
Marshall was a Liberal Party councillor on Wallasey Borough Council 1963-65 and parliamentary candidate for Louth in 1964 and 1966, but joined the Labour Party in 1967.

In a 1971 by-election, Marshall was elected as the Member of Parliament (MP) for Goole. From 1976 to 1979, he served as Parliamentary Private Secretary to the Home Secretary, and as Chair of the Select Committee on Trade and Industry.  He left Parliament in 1983, when the Goole constituency was abolished in boundary changes.

After Parliament
In 1985, Marshall transferred to the Social Democratic Party and subsequently became a member of the Liberal Democrats. He fought Bridlington for the SDP in 1987, coming second. In 2015 he became a Trustee of the Parliamentary Outreach Trust.

From 1997 to 2007, he advised the Church of England Bishop of Wakefield on ecumenical matters, and from 2000 to 2015 was a member of the General Synod of the Church of England.

Marshall is the author of two published books:  Parliament and the Public (Macmillan 1982) and Business and Society (Routledge 1993).

From 1984 to 2000, he was a lecturer in Management Science at the University of Bradford School of Management.

Personal life
In 1969 he married Margaret Pamela Antill in Enfield. They have a daughter (born 1975).
In 2019 he married Margaret Anthea Masding (née Martin Smith) in Oxford.

References 

Times Guide to the House of Commons, 1966 & 1979

Yorkshire and the Humber Liberals Democrats website

External links
 They Work For You

1940 births
Living people
Labour Party (UK) MPs for English constituencies
Liberal Party (UK) councillors
Liberal Party (UK) parliamentary candidates
Liberal Democrats (UK) politicians
Social Democratic Party (UK) parliamentary candidates
UK MPs 1970–1974
UK MPs 1974
UK MPs 1974–1979
UK MPs 1979–1983
People from Cleethorpes
Academics of the University of Bradford
Alumni of Magdalen College, Oxford
Alumni of the University of Liverpool
Councillors in Merseyside
English Methodists
Methodist local preachers